The meridian 9° east of Greenwich is a line of longitude that extends from the North Pole across the Arctic Ocean, Europe, Africa, the Atlantic Ocean, the Southern Ocean, and Antarctica to the South Pole.

The 9th meridian east forms a great circle with the 171st meridian west.

From Pole to Pole
Starting at the North Pole and heading south to the South Pole, the 9th meridian east passes through:

{| class="wikitable plainrowheaders"
! scope="col" width="125" | Co-ordinates
! scope="col" | Country, territory or sea
! scope="col" | Notes
|-
| style="background:#b0e0e6;" | 
! scope="row" style="background:#b0e0e6;" | Arctic Ocean
| style="background:#b0e0e6;" |
|-
| style="background:#b0e0e6;" | 
! scope="row" style="background:#b0e0e6;" | Atlantic Ocean
| style="background:#b0e0e6;" |
|-
| 
! scope="row" | 
| Entering at Hitra in Sør-Trøndelag. Exiting at Tverrdalsøya in Aust-Agder.
|-
| style="background:#b0e0e6;" | 
! scope="row" style="background:#b0e0e6;" | Skagerrak
| style="background:#b0e0e6;" |
|-
| 
! scope="row" | 
| North Jutlandic Island
|-
| style="background:#b0e0e6;" | 
! scope="row" style="background:#b0e0e6;" | Limfjord
| style="background:#b0e0e6;" |
|-
| 
! scope="row" | 
| Jutland mainland
|-
| 
! scope="row" | 
| just west of DCF77 time signal transmitter
|-
| 
! scope="row" | 
|
|-
| 
! scope="row" | 
| For about 2km
|-
| 
! scope="row" | 
| For about 16km
|-
| 
! scope="row" | 
|
|-
| style="background:#b0e0e6;" | 
! scope="row" style="background:#b0e0e6;" | Mediterranean Sea
| style="background:#b0e0e6;" | Ligurian Sea
|-
| 
! scope="row" | 
| Island of Corsica
|-
| style="background:#b0e0e6;" | 
! scope="row" style="background:#b0e0e6;" | Mediterranean Sea
| style="background:#b0e0e6;" | Strait of Bonifacio
|-
| 
! scope="row" | 
| Island of Sardinia
|-
| style="background:#b0e0e6;" | 
! scope="row" style="background:#b0e0e6;" | Mediterranean Sea
| style="background:#b0e0e6;" | Passing just east of the Galite Islands, 
|-
| 
! scope="row" | 
|
|-
| 
! scope="row" | 
|
|-
| 
! scope="row" | 
|
|-
| 
! scope="row" | 
|
|-
| 
! scope="row" | 
|
|-valign="top"
| style="background:#b0e0e6;" | 
! scope="row" style="background:#b0e0e6;" | Atlantic Ocean
| style="background:#b0e0e6;" | Gulf of Guinea - passing just east of the island of Bioko, 
|-
| 
! scope="row" | 
|
|-
| style="background:#b0e0e6;" | 
! scope="row" style="background:#b0e0e6;" | Atlantic Ocean
| style="background:#b0e0e6;" |
|-
| style="background:#b0e0e6;" | 
! scope="row" style="background:#b0e0e6;" | Southern Ocean
| style="background:#b0e0e6;" |
|-
| 
! scope="row" | Antarctica
| Queen Maud Land, claimed by 
|-
|}

See also
8th meridian east
10th meridian east

e009th meridian east